Louise McCarren Herring (September 20, 1909 – November 2, 1987), was an Ohio native, recognized as one of the pioneer leaders of the not-for-profit cooperative credit union movement in the United States. Herring is universally regarded in the United States credit union movement as being the “Mother of Credit Unions” for her work with the movement since its earliest days.

Herring was one of the attendees at the 1934 Estes Park, Colorado, meeting that established the Credit Union National Association (better known as CUNA). Also attending the Estes Park meeting were Edward Filene, Claude Clark, and Dora Maxwell. Herring’s commitment to the value of credit unions elevated her to national leader of the movement.  Herring is credited with helping to establish five hundred credit unions and was a supporter of the dual share insurance system, helping to establish the private National Deposit Guaranty Corporation, which is now known as American Share Insurance (ASI).

Prior to her marriage, she served as the first paid Executive Secretary of the Ohio Credit Union League (now Ohio Credit Union System) which she co-founded. Herring also served as the longtime manager of KEMBA (Kroger Employees Mutual Benefit Association) Credit Union in Cincinnati.

Herring was inducted into the National Cooperative Business Association's  Cooperative Hall of Fame in 1983. CUNA annually awards the Louise Herring Award for Philosophy in Action, which recognizes those credit unions which “demonstrate the exceptional effort to integrate credit union philosophy” (not for profit but for service) into the daily operations of their credit unions and recognize their commitment to superior service to their member/owners. The Ohio Credit Union System tri-annually awards the Louise McCarren Herring Lifetime Achievement Award to those individuals who have demonstrated a lifetime dedication to the advancement of the credit union movement in Ohio.

Louise McCarren Herring died in Cincinnati, Ohio, in 1987.

See also
History of credit unions

References

External links
 More detailed biography of Herring.

1909 births
1987 deaths
People from Cincinnati
American cooperative organizers